The vice president of Equatorial Guinea is the second highest political position obtainable in Equatorial Guinea. Following the 2011 constitutional reform, there is a provision for two vice presidents who are appointed by the president of Equatorial Guinea.

List of vice presidents (1968–1982)
The position was established in 1968, and abolished in 1982 with the adoption of the new constitution.

Vice presidents

First vice presidents

Second vice presidents

List of vice presidents (2012–present)

First vice presidents

Second vice presidents

See also

 Politics of Equatorial Guinea
 List of presidents of Equatorial Guinea
 List of prime ministers of Equatorial Guinea
 List of colonial governors of Spanish Guinea

Notes

References

Government of Equatorial Guinea
Equatorial Guinea
Equatorial Guinea
Vice presidents of Equatorial Guinea
1968 establishments in Equatorial Guinea